"Free as a Bird" is the title track from Supertramp's 1987 album of the same name. Released as a single at the end of that year, the song achieved only marginal commercial success, with a top-25 showing on the Polish charts being a relative highlight.

Overview
The music video for "Free as a Bird" was produced by Sue Pemberton and directed by Michael Patterson and Candace Reckenger.

Cash Box said that "Rick Davies sets an easy groove with his patented, bluesy keyboard style, and takes you to a gospel out-chorus."

In 1988 "Free as a Bird" was performed on the Dutch pop music television series, TopPop.

In 2012, Something Else! ranked "Free as a Bird" as the 3rd worst song by Supertramp in their list of the 5 worst Supertramp songs, calling it ..."painful to listen to" and "Utterly uninspired". Although John Helliwell's saxophone solo was noted as being "decent".

It is the only song from the album of the same name that survived the accompanying tour. Live recordings were released on Live '88 and It Was the Best of Times.

"Free as a Bird" also appears on Supertramp's 1992 best-of album The Very Best of Supertramp 2 and the later compilation Retrospectacle – The Supertramp Anthology.

Track listing
7" vinyl, Cassette
"Free as a Bird" – 4:20
"Thing For You" – 3:59

Personnel
According the Free as a Bird and The Very Best of Supertramp 2 liner notes.
Rick Davies - vocals, keyboards, producer
John Anthony Helliwell - saxophone
Dougie Thomson - bass
Bob C. Benberg - drums
Other personnel
Supertramp – producer
Mark Hart – vocals, guitar and keyboards
Marty Walsh – guitar
Linda Foot – backing vocals
Lise Miller – backing vocals
Evan Rogers – backing vocals
Karyn White – backing vocals

Charts

References

1987 songs
1987 singles
A&M Records singles
Supertramp songs
Songs written by Rick Davies